Juri Toppan (born 20 January 1990) is an Italian footballer who plays as a centre back and left back defender.

Biography

Youth career
Born in Treviso, Veneto, Toppan started his career at Friuli side Udinese, he was a member of Udinese Giovanissimi Nazionali team in 2004–05 season. At the start of 2005–06 season he once returned to Sandonà after the loan expired but signed outright by Udinese on 31 August 2005. He was in the Udinese's Primavera under-20 squad that lost to Inter Primavera in the League playoffs round semi–final in 2007–08 season. He then left for Swiss Challenge League side La Chaux-de-Fonds and on 30 January 2009 signed by Internazionale. He made his debut for Primavera team on the next day. That half season he made 7 appearances.

Lega Pro clubs
In August 2009, he was loaned to Villacidrese of Lega Pro Seconda Divisione along with Inter teammate Matteo Lombardo. Toppan made his professional debut with Villacidrese, but on 1 February 2010 loaned to Serie A side Catania for their Primavera team, with a handful appearances.

On 29 June 2010, he was sold to newly promoted Prima Divisione side Spezia in co-ownership deal, for a peppercorn fee of €500. He was the understudy of Daniele Pedrelli, also an Inter youth product. He failed to play any league matches due to injury.

In June 2011 Inter gave up the remain 50% registration rights to Spezia. On 4 August he terminated his contract in order to join fellow third division club U.S. Foggia on free transfer.

After Foggia's bankruptcy, Toppan was signed by his hometown club Treviso, rejoining Inter teammate Jacopo Fortunato and Antonio Esposito. Toppan made his debut in a friendly match.

International career
Toppan received a call-up from Italy U17 team for 2007 UEFA European Under-17 Football Championship qualification in November 2006, but not selected to any match, even as unused substitute. He also received a call-up on 2 January (for training camp and against local teams) and against Republic of Ireland U17 on 23 and 25 January to prepare for the elite round.

On 6 September 2007, he received a call-up from Italy U18 (for training camp) and again on 27 September. On 24 April 2008, he received his last call-up, against Serbia U18, where he made his debut in the second half, substituted Daniele Mori.

References

External links
 Profile at Football.it 
 

Italian footballers
Italy youth international footballers
Udinese Calcio players
FC La Chaux-de-Fonds players
Inter Milan players
S.S. Villacidrese Calcio players
Catania S.S.D. players
Spezia Calcio players
Treviso F.B.C. 1993 players
Association football fullbacks
Italian expatriate footballers
Expatriate footballers in Switzerland
Italian expatriate sportspeople in Switzerland
Sportspeople from Treviso
1990 births
Living people
Footballers from Veneto